Audax is the name of a 5th/6th century grammarian. His work is cited in Saint Boniface's Ars Bonifacii.

References

Grammarians of Latin
5th-century Latin writers
6th-century Latin writers